Marius Aurelian Curtuiuș (born August 8, 1989) is a Romanian professional footballer who plays for Liga III side Gloria Bistrița-Năsăud as a striker. In his career Curtuiuș played in the Liga I and Liga II for teams such as: Gloria Bistrița, Râmnicu Vâlcea, Olt Slatina and UTA Arad.

References

External links

1989 births
Living people
Romanian footballers
Association football midfielders
Liga I players
ACF Gloria Bistrița players
Liga II players
SCM Râmnicu Vâlcea players
FC UTA Arad players
CSM Reșița players
CS Gloria Bistrița-Năsăud footballers
Sportspeople from Bistrița
21st-century Romanian people